Fernando Rubén González Pineda (born 27 January 1994), also known as El Oso, is a Mexican professional footballer who plays as a defensive midfielder for Liga MX club Guadalajara.

Career
González made his professional debut with C.D. Guadalajara on 24 February 2013 against Club León. González was loaned to Coras to gain more playing experience.

On 19 June 2019, González joined Club América.

Honours
Necaxa
Copa MX: Clausura 2018
Supercopa MX: 2018

América
Campeón de Campeones: 2019

References

External links
 
 

1994 births
Living people
Footballers from Mexico City
Mexican footballers
C.D. Guadalajara footballers
Club Atlético Zacatepec players
Club Necaxa footballers
Club América footballers
Club León footballers
Liga MX players
Liga Premier de México players
Association football midfielders